Prunus × incam, sometimes called the Okamé cherry, although that name rightly belongs to its Okamé cultivar, is a hybrid species of flowering cherry, the result of a cross between Prunus incisa (Fuji cherry) and Prunus campanulata (Taiwan or bellflower cherry). It is a small tree, reaching 8m, with silver bark and showy pink flowers. Its leaves are obovate or oblanceolate, 47 to 70mm long and 22 to 31mm wide. Its fall foliage is an attractive bronze-orangish-red. Due to its hybrid nature, fruit are rarely produced even though it produces large amounts of pollen, and so it is propagated and sold commercially by cuttings.

Prunus × incam was developed by Collingwood Ingram before 1942 by pollinating Prunus incisa with pollen from Prunus campanulata. In 1993 the 'Okamé' cultivar won the Royal Horticultural Society's Award of Garden Merit, and in 2012 the 'Shosar' cultivar also won the Award. In addition to having a longer flowering period than most cherries, their inflorescences retain their red sepals and hypanthia for one or two weeks after the deeply emarginate petals have fallen, increasing their ornamental value. A number of cultivars are commercially available.

Notes

References

incam
Hybrid prunus
Cherry blossom
Interspecific plant hybrids
Ornamental plant cultivars
Plants described in 2009